Battleships is the international title of a video game based on the classic board game. The object is to sink the opponent's entire fleet (six ships) without him sinking the player's fleet first.

This version of the game had the particularity of allowing fire by salvos of up to 24 shots, depending on the number of unsunk ships the player had. After all shots were placed by the player, a scene showing a ship firing its guns at the enemy fleet was played, showing hits and damage. The game could be played in Hotseat, since each player's fleet placement was never shown after the game had started proper.

There also have been other versions of the battleship game for various consoles and handheld devices, including Battleship.

Reviews
Computer and Video Games (CVG) (Sep, 1987)
The Games Machine (UK) (Dec, 1987)
ASM (Aktueller Software Markt) (Oct, 1990)
Commodore User (Sep, 1987)
ASM (Aktueller Software Markt) (Sep, 1987)
ST Action (Jun, 1988)
Computer and Video Games (CVG) (Jun, 1990)
Commodore User (Apr, 1988)
Info (Jan, 1989)
Your Sinclair (Sep, 1988)
Zero (May, 1990)
ACE (Advanced Computer Entertainment) (May, 1988)
Happy Computer (Sep, 1987)
ASM (Aktueller Software Markt) (Oct, 1987)

References

External links
 

1987 video games
Amiga games
Amstrad CPC games
BBC Micro and Acorn Electron games
Commodore 64 games
Naval video games
Turn-based strategy video games
Video games based on board games
Video games based on Hasbro toys
Video games developed in the United Kingdom
ZX Spectrum games